Communauté d'agglomération Flers Agglo is the communauté d'agglomération, an intercommunal structure, centred on the town of Flers. It is located in the Orne department, in the Normandy region, northwestern France. Created in 2013, its seat is in Flers. Its area is 567.7 km2. Its population was 53,555 in 2019, of which 14,762 in Flers proper.

Composition
The communauté d'agglomération consists of the following 42 communes:

Athis-Val de Rouvre
Aubusson
Banvou
La Bazoque
Bellou-en-Houlme
Berjou
Briouze
Cahan
Caligny
Cerisy-Belle-Étoile
La Chapelle-au-Moine
La Chapelle-Biche
Le Châtellier
La Coulonche
Dompierre
Durcet
Échalou
La Ferrière-aux-Étangs
La Ferté Macé
Flers
Le Grais
La Lande-Patry
La Lande-Saint-Siméon
Landigou
Landisacq
Lonlay-le-Tesson
Le Ménil-de-Briouze
Ménil-Hubert-sur-Orne
Messei
Montilly-sur-Noireau
Les Monts d'Andaine
Pointel
Saint-André-de-Messei
Saint-Clair-de-Halouze
Sainte-Honorine-la-Chardonne
Sainte-Opportune
Saint-Georges-des-Groseillers
Saint-Paul
Saint-Philbert-sur-Orne
Saint-Pierre-du-Regard
Saires-la-Verrerie
La Selle-la-Forge

References

Flers
Flers